The 1924 Major League Baseball season was contested from April 15 to October 10, 1924. The New York Giants and Washington Senators were the regular season champions of the National League and American League, respectively. The Senators then defeated the Giants in the World Series, four games to three.

This was the third of eight seasons that "League Awards", a precursor to the Major League Baseball Most Valuable Player Award (introduced in 1931), were issued.

Awards and honors
League Award
 Walter Johnson, Washington Senators, P
 Dazzy Vance, Brooklyn Dodgers, P

Statistical leaders

1 American League Triple Crown Pitching Winner

2 National League Triple Crown Pitching Winner

Standings

American League

National League

Postseason

Bracket

Managers

American League

National League

Home Field Attendance

References

External links
1924 Major League Baseball season schedule at Baseball Reference

 
Major League Baseball seasons